Events from the year 1794 in Poland

Incumbents
 Monarch – Stanisław II August

 - Warsaw Uprising (1794)
 - Wilno Uprising (1794)

Births

Deaths

References

 
Years of the 18th century in Poland